Joe H. Mulholland (August 26, 1934 – October 16, 2014) was an American businessman and politician.

Born to Roy and Gladys Mulholland in Neshoba County, Mississippi, Joe H. Mulholland received his bachelor's degree from Mississippi State University and his law degree from Mississippi College School of Law. He practiced law in Philadelphia, Mississippi, worked in a bank, and raised cattle. He served in the Mississippi State Senate from 1964 to 1968, and from 1976 to 1984. He died in Meridian, Mississippi of cancer. A member and deacon of Mt. Carmel Church of God, Neshoba County, he was interred in Mars Hill Cemetery.

Notes

1934 births
2014 deaths
People from Philadelphia, Mississippi
Mississippi State University alumni
Mississippi College School of Law alumni
Businesspeople from Mississippi
Mississippi lawyers
Mississippi state senators
Deaths from cancer in Mississippi
20th-century American businesspeople
20th-century American lawyers